An observer is one who engages in observation or in watching an experiment.

Observer may also refer to:

Computer science and information theory
 In information theory, any system which receives information from an object
 State observer in control theory, a system that models a real system in order to provide an estimate of its internal state
 Observer pattern, a design pattern used in computer programming

Fiction
 Observer (video game), a cyberpunk horror video game
 Observer (Mystery Science Theater 3000), a fictional television character
 Observers, beings in the television show Fringe

Military
 Air observer, an aircrew member
 Artillery observer, a front line personnel who directs fire discipline for artillery strikes
 Royal Observer Corps, a civil defence organisation, originally tasked with reporting enemy aircraft
 Observer, a non-participating officer, or umpire, tasked with observing the actions of soldiers during a field training or military exercise

Music
 "Observer", a song by Gary Numan on his album The Pleasure Principle
 "The Observer", a track from The Flaming Lips' 1999 album The Soft Bulletin
 The Observers, an alternative name for reggae session band Soul Syndicate
 Niney the Observer (born 1951), Jamaican record producer and singer

Publications
 Observer.com, an online-only version of the weekly newspaper The New York Observer
 Sunday Observer (Sri Lanka), a weekly newspaper
 Observer (APS), a member magazine of Association for Psychological Science
 The Observer (disambiguation), any of various periodicals

Science
 Observer (general relativity)
 Observer (meteorological)
 Observer (physics)
 Observer (quantum physics)
 Observer (special relativity)
 Observational astronomy

Other uses
 Observer status, granted by an organization to allow a non-member limited participation
 An election observer, one who assists in election monitoring
 A game official sometimes used in the sport Ultimate
 The Observer type in the Enneagram of Personality model
Donald Alaster Macdonald (1859–1932), Australian journalist who wrote under the pseudonym 'Observer'

See also
 Observer effect (disambiguation)
 National Observer (disambiguation), a variety of publications
 United Nations Military Observer